Noamamito is a village in López de Micay Municipality, Cauca Department in Colombia.

Climate
Noamamito has an extremely wet tropical rainforest climate (Af).

References

Populated places in the Cauca Department